Bahadur Gurung Gupta (born 7 September 1976) is a skier from India. He qualified for 2006 Winter Olympics, where he represented India. He participated in Men's sprint event of Cross-country skiing. He finished 78 in his event.

He was third in the International Cross-country skiing race at Gulmarg in January 2005. He also participated and did well in Cross-country races held in Bolu Gerede and Uludag Balkan.

He joined the Indian Army in 1999, and subsequently started training for up 15 km cross-country skiing. He won National Championships and was named the best athlete at the National Winter Games in Auli, 2002.

See also
 Cross-country skiing at the 2006 Winter Olympics – Men's sprint
 Cross-country skiing at the 2006 Winter Olympics
 2006 Winter Olympics

References

External links
 

Indian male cross-country skiers
1976 births
Living people
Olympic cross-country skiers of India
Cross-country skiers at the 2006 Winter Olympics
Indian Army personnel
Cross-country skiers at the 2007 Asian Winter Games